Münchberg is a small town in Upper Franconia (Bavaria), Germany. It is sometimes referred to as the Textile Town of Bavaria.

Its sister city is Jefferson City, Missouri, United States.

Geography

The town districts

History
The first settlement of the area around Münchberg probably dates back to the 10th century. The original name probably read 'Monk Mountain', as the first settlers were monks. The name changed itself in the course of time and documents first mentioned Münchberg in around 1224. Between 1938 and 1978, Münchberg was district town of the district of the same name.

Sport
The town's association football club, FC Münchberg, experienced its greatest success in the late sixties when it spent a season in the third division Bayernliga. In 2000 the club merged with SC Eintracht Münchberg to form FC Eintracht Münchberg.

References

External links
  

Hof (district)